The Ukrainian Greek Orthodox Church of St. Mary (Szypentiz district) is an historic Ukrainian Orthodox Church of Canada congregation and building in a rural district near Two Hills, Alberta.  The church was constructed in 1917 after the congregation's previous church was lost in a fire. It is noted for its use of brickwork (whereas most similar rural churches in Alberta are wooden), and interior decoration by Ukrainian-Albertan icon painter Peter Lapinski.

It was named a Provincial Historic Resource in 1987.

Notes

Ukrainian Orthodox Church of Canada churches
Provincial Historic Resources of Alberta
County of Two Hills No. 21
Churches in Alberta